Hippolais is a genus of tree warbler in the family Acrocephalidae. It is sometimes associated with the genus Iduna. The genus name Hippolais is from Ancient Greek hupolais, as misspelt by Linnaeus. It referred to a small bird mentioned by Aristotle and others and may be onomatopoeic or derived from hupo,"under", and laas, "stone".

Species
It contains the following species:

References

 
Bird genera